The Lupșa is a left tributary of the river Olt in Romania. It flows into the Olt near Cuciulata.

References

Rivers of Romania
Rivers of Brașov County